The 1981 YCO-Tanduay season was the seventh season of the franchise in the Philippine Basketball Association (PBA).

Transactions

Summary
The two imports of Yco-Tanduay in the Open Conference are Lawyer "Boots" Taylor and Kenneth Austin. Taylor played only two games before being replaced by the comebacking veteran Eugene Moore. Austin played six games and was replaced by Mark Haymore. Yco-Tanduay lost their first 11 games of the season before they finally broke into win column with a 121–104 triumph over fellow tailender Presto Fun Drinks on May 16.  Coach Tito Eduque was replaced by former Yco and Tanduay player Freddie Webb on the Esquires bench after 10 games.

In the Reinforced Filipino Conference, Yco-Tanduay signed up Russell Murray as their import and they were the third team to qualify in the round of six by posting a 5–4 won-loss card in the elimination phase.  The Esquires enters the four-team semifinal round by ousting Open Conference champion Toyota Super Diesels, 124-118 on October 27. They lost to Presto Fun Drinks in their last semifinal outing on November 14. The winner of their do-or-die match would have advanced to the finals against U-Tex had Crispa Redmanizers lost to the Wranglers in the second game of the double-header.

Won-loss record vs Opponents

Awards
Russell Murray won best import honors in the Reinforced Filipino Conference and becomes the second recipient of the award.

Roster

References

YCO-Tanduay
Tanduay Rhum Masters seasons